is a former Japanese football player.

Playing career
Kazuma Ikarino played for Ohara JaSRA, AC Nagano Parceiro and Renofa Yamaguchi FC from 2005 to 2015.

Club statistics
Updated to 22 February 2016.

References

External links
Profile at Renofa Yamaguchi

1986 births
Living people
Association football people from Hiroshima Prefecture
Japanese footballers
J3 League players
Japan Football League players
AC Nagano Parceiro players
Renofa Yamaguchi FC players
Association football defenders